The Chimayó (or Chimayo) pepper is a New Mexico chile pepper landrace of the species Capsicum annuum. It is considered one of the two best chiles in the state, the others being those grown in Hatch. The pepper is so prized that powdered Chimayó pepper can cost as much as $45 per pound. Chimayó chiles have a complex flavor described as sweet and smoky, and are extremely popular in New Mexican cuisine for making posole and carne adovada.

The arid climate of the town of Chimayó greatly influences the appearance of the Chimayó pepper, giving it a twisted shape when dried. Its color can be compared to that of the Jalapeño, transitioning from green to red as the fruit matures. Chimayó peppers are of medium pungency, and have a heat level ranging from 4,000 to 6,000 on the Scoville scale.

Chimayó peppers are commonly dried by being hung on ristras; once dried, they can be ground into chile powder or chile flakes.  The flavor is described as sweet, earthy, and smoky, without being too hot, and the fruit is also fleshier and drier  The pepper can also be used fresh for salsas, stir-frys, roasted, or stuffed.

Because the soil of Tsi Mayoh, which the pepper is grown in, is considered to be holy ground; culminating in the presence of El Santuario de Chimayo. The Chimayó chile is considered sacred within New Mexican culture, and is a part of the region's folk Pueblo Christianity.

See also
 Big Jim pepper
 Fresno chile
 New Mexico No. 9
 Sandia pepper
 Santa Fe Grande
 New Mexico chile
 List of Capsicum cultivars

References

Capsicum cultivars
Chili peppers
Crops originating from North America
Cuisine of the Southwestern United States
Fruit vegetables
Mexican cuisine
Chile
Spices